Jula Deh (also Romanized as Jūlā Deh; also known as Jolfā Deh) is a village in Rudbar-e Shahrestan Rural District, Alamut-e Gharbi District, Qazvin County, Qazvin Province, Iran. At the 2006 census, its population was 67, in 24 families.

References 

Populated places in Qazvin County